Psammophis angolensis, sometimes known as the dwarf sand snake, is a species of snake in the family Psammophiidae reaching a maximum length of 50 cm, but averaging 30 cm. The snake actively forages for lizards and frogs.

The species is widespread in sub-Saharan Africa, ranging from Tanzania and the Democratic Republic of the Congo, through Zambia, Malawi, Mozambique, westwards to Angola and southwards through Zimbabwe to South Africa.

References

Psammophis
Snakes of Africa
Reptiles of Angola
Reptiles of Botswana
Reptiles of the Democratic Republic of the Congo
Reptiles of Ethiopia
Reptiles of Malawi
Reptiles of Mozambique
Reptiles of Namibia
Reptiles of South Africa
Reptiles of Tanzania
Reptiles of Zambia
Reptiles of Zimbabwe
Reptiles described in 1872
Taxa named by José Vicente Barbosa du Bocage